São Matias may refer to:
 São Matias, Goa, a village on Divar island, Tiswadi, in the Indian state of Goa
 São Matias (Beja) ,a parish of Beja Municipality, in southeast Portugal